The Taltson River is a roughly  river in the Northwest Territories of Canada that drains into the Great Slave Lake.
There are three hydroelectric power control structures on the river, and one power station.

Name
The river was formerly known as the Copper Indian River in reference to the Dene known as the Yellowknives or Copper Indians. The name is derived from Tatsan which means "scum of water" and is an expression for copper.
A 1918 government source says the name means "between high rocks".
Other names formerly used include Copper Indian, Rocher, Rock, T'altsan and Yellow Knife.

Basin

The Taltson River basin has a subhumid, high boreal ecoclimate.
Summer are typically cool and winters are very cold.
It contains a complex of interconnected lakes that drain first in a southwest direction and then northward into the Slave River lowland zone.
The Tazin River is a major tributary.
There are three hydroelectric control structures in the basin, at Nonacho Lake, Tazin Lake and Twin Gorges.

Sub-catchment areas are:

Course

The Taltson River rises near a series of lakes, including Coventry Lake and Dymond Lake in the northeast of the basin.
It flows north to McArthur Lake, then west to Gray Lake, an arm of Nonacho Lake.
Nonacho Lake is the largest lake in the river basin.
It discharges to the Taltson River directly via the Nonacho Dam and indirectly via the Tronka Chua Gap, Tronka Chua Lake and Thekulthili Lake to rejoin the river at Lady Grey Lake. 
From Nonacho Lake to the Twin Gorges Forebay the river flows through a series of lakes, low-gradient reaches, rapids and waterfalls.
Often there is just a short section of rapids between the outflow of one lake and the backwaters of the next lake.
Taltson Lake, King Lake and Lady Grey Lakes are the larger lakes in this section.
It is joined in this section by the Tazin River, its largest tributary.

The Konth River drains from the northeast into Tsu Lake.
It receives the outflows of the Rutledge River and Tethul River in this stretch.
Rocher River, on the east bank of the lower Taltson River, was originally a trading post of the Hudson's Bay Company.
It had a school, but that was burned down in 1958, and the trading post closed in 1963.
The government put pressure on the residents to move to Fort Resolution.
The river enters the southern shore of Great Slave Lake at the western end of the Simpson Island chain.

Hydroelectricity

A dam on Tazin Lake diverts most of the water to the Charlot River system where it drives hydroelectric facilities that feed the Saskatchewan power grid.

The Taltson dam was built in 1966 to supply power to the lead-zinc mine at Pine Point.
An 18 MW hydro unit  with a 300 kW emergency standby diesel generator provides power via  of transmission lines to Fort Smith, Hay River, Hay River Reserve, Fort Resolution and Enterprise.
Flooding below the dam has been blamed on the power plant.
However, the Northwest Territories Power Corporation (NTPC) states that the operation is similar to a run-of-river generation facility and has minimal impact on the river's natural flow.
High water flows upstream of the dam will cause high flows downstream.

In 2007 the Dezé Energy Corporation presented a proposal to expand the Taltson River hydroelectric capacity with a new 36 MW hydroelectric plant at Twin Gorges Forebay to increase total capacity there to 54 MW, and to build a  transmission line to carry power via Taltson Lake and Noncho Lake to the north of Great Slave Lake.
The project would also involve construction of a new control structure and rock-cut discharge canal beside the Nonacho rock-fill dam.

See also
List of rivers of the Northwest Territories
Taltson River Airport

References

Sources

Rivers of the Northwest Territories